Helena D'Algy (born Antónia Lozano Guedes Infante; 18 June 1906 – after 1991) was a Portuguese film actress. She appeared in 20 films, the majority in Hollywood during the silent era. Her career began to falter following the introduction of sound. D'Algy later starred in the Spanish-language box office hit Suburban Melody (1933), her last known film role. She was the sister of actor Tony D'Algy. She was last seen in a 1991 documentary.

Selected filmography 

 Lend Me Your Husband (1924)
 It Is the Law (1924)
 A Sainted Devil (1924)
 Pretty Ladies (1925)
 Daddy's Gone A-Hunting (1925)
 Confessions of a Queen (1925)
 Siberia (1926)
 Don Juan (1926)
 The Cowboy and the Countess (1926)
 The Exquisite Sinner (1926)
 The Silver Treasure (1926)
 A Race of Noblemen (1927)
 Let's Get Married (1931)
 Between Night and Day (1932)
 Suburban Melody (1933)

References

Bibliography 
 Finkielman, Jorge (2004). The Film Industry in Argentina: An Illustrated Cultural History. Jefferson, North Carolina: McFarland

External links 

 

1906 births
Year of death unknown
Place of death unknown
20th-century Portuguese actresses
Actresses from Lisbon
Expatriate actresses in the United States
Portuguese expatriates in the United States
Portuguese film actresses
Portuguese silent film actresses